Christmas is the first Christmas album and tenth studio album overall from American new-age pianist Kevin Kern, and the first to be released on his own label, Kevin Kern Music. As with his other albums, it is an album of instrumental songs, in this case instrumental covers of Christmas carols and hymns. It was released on October 15, 2012.

Track listing
"Angels We Have Heard on High" (Traditional) - 3:02
"Joy to the World" (Lowell Mason) - 3:29
"Il est né, le divin Enfant" (Traditional) - 2:44
"Away in a Manger" (Traditional) - 2:15
"In the Bleak Midwinter" (Gustav Holst) - 3:53
"Good King Wenceslas" (Traditional) - 5:01
"Lo, How a Rose E'er Blooming (Es ist ein Ros entsprungen)" (Michael Praetorius) - 4:07
"What Child is This?" (Traditional) - 2:09
"Hark! The Herald Angels Sing" (Charles Wesley) - 3:32
"It Came Upon the Midnight Clear" (Richard Storrs Willis) - 3:44
"O Come, O Come, Emmanuel" (Traditional) - 2:44
"O Holy Night" (Adolphe Adam) - 4:14
"The First Noel" (Traditional) - 3:11
"O Christmas Tree (O Tannenbaum)" (Traditional) - 4:38
"The Holly and the Ivy" (Traditional) - 4:11
"Silent Night" (Franz Xaver Gruber) - 3:10

Personnel
 Kevin Kern - Steinway grand piano

References

External links
Kevin Kern's official website
The album at Amazon

2012 albums
2012 Christmas albums
Christmas albums by American artists
Kevin Kern albums
New-age Christmas albums